Jackson Street may refer to:
Jackson Street (Augusta, Georgia) (former)
Jackson Street (San Francisco)
Jackson Street (Hamilton, Ontario)
Jackson Street (SEPTA Route 101 station), in the borough of Media, Pennsylvania